Serhiy Ostapenko (November 1881—1937) was economist, statesman, and political activist of Ukraine. In the beginning of 1919 he directed the Council of People's Ministers of Ukrainian People's Republic (prime-minister).

Early years
Ostapenko was born in November 1881 in the town of Troyaniv near Zhytomyr. Today it is the village of Zhytomyr Raion, Zhytomyr Oblast. Ostapenko was born into family of a poor peasants and his father had another job as a freight transporter. From 1893 to 1897, Ostapenko attended the local elementary school, after which, he enrolled into an agrarian middle school in Bilokrynytsia of Kremenets uyezd (today Kremenets Raion of Ternopil Oblast).

In 1904, he started working as a teacher in a two-grade school of Turiysk of Kovel uyezd. In 1905, Ostapenko was arrested for being a member of the [Ukrainian Socialist Revolutionary Party]. He spent the next three years in jail for political reasons as he claimed. After his release, Ostapenko had some trouble of finding employment. He graduated from the Vladimir cadet corps after final tests in 1909 and the same year enrolled into the Economic school of Kyiv Commercial Institute (now Kyiv National Economic University). Upon his graduation in 1913 he was sent to Germany for extended studies in Economics.

In 1913 he returned to Ukraine where he found the job as head of the Bureau of Statistics in Balta uyezd of Podolia Governorate. In 1914 Ostapenko was transferred to Kharkiv where he headed the Bureau of Statistics for the Mining Industry of Sloboda Ukraine. Later he returned to Kyiv where he worked as a private-docent in the Kyiv Commercial Institute until 1917.

The revolution
In January 1918, Ostapenko was appointed as an economic adviser to the Ukrainian economic commission of Vsevolod Holubovych for the negotiations in Brest-Litovsk (see Treaty of Brest-Litovsk (Ukraine–Central Powers). On March 14, 1918 he worked to the trade commission of Mykola Porsh for the goods exchange with the Central Powers and responsible to the Council of People's Ministers.

During the times of the Ukrainian State Ostapenko was included to the Serhiy Shelukhin's economic commission of the Ukrainian peace delegation during the negotiations with the delegation of the Soviet Russia in Kyiv. These negotiations took place from May 23 through October 7, 1918. Concurrently, he lectured in political economy, economical geography, and others for various schools in Kyiv.

Statesman career
After the Directorate of Ukraine forced Pavlo Skoropadskyi to emigrate, Ostapenko, being a member of the Ukrainian SR party and was appointed to the socialist government of Volodymyr Chekhivsky as the minister of trade and industry. In February 1919 when the government of Ukraine had to relocate out of Kyiv to Vinnytsia with the advancing Bolshevik forces, Ostapenko discontinued his membership with the Ukrainian SRs. After the resignation of several ministers from the government he was performing the duties of the minister of political agitation and propaganda. On February 6, 1919 he participated as the representative of the Ukrainian government in the negotiations with the Chief of staff of the French military forces of Colonel Freidenberg (see Entente intervention) at the railroad station of Birzula, near Odesa. The Ukrainians were requesting from the representatives of the Entente recognition of the sovereignty of Ukraine, allowing it to participate at the Paris Peace Conference, and several other important factors. After the negotiations brought no results the government of Chekhivsky resigned.

The Directorate of Ukraine requested Ostapenko who was appointed to find the understanding (?) with the members of the Entente to form another government. His government was composed mostly out of more liberal-democratic representatives, but as the government did not bring any real results in the short period of time in couple of months it was replaced by the government of more socially oriented Borys Martos. Ostapenko found no place in the new government was found and he moved for couple of months to Galicia.

Professor's career
After some successes at the Bolshevik front and the liberation of Podilia, he moved to Kamianets-Podilskyi that since June 1919 served as the temporary administrative center of the Ukrainian People's Republic until the end of 1919. Still unable to find a job Ostapenko applied to the Kamyanets-Podilsky State University that was hiring numerous professors and private-docents in various fields.

On July 18, 1919 the minister of education Anton Krushelnytsky accepted his application by the reference of the University's first rector Ilarion Ohienko. Ostapenko became a private-docent at the Department of Statistics of the University's Jurisprudential School and started his work in October 1919. On November 5, 1919 the council of the University's professors asked him to lecture the political economy beside his classes of statistics. On February 25, 1920 Ostapenko was confirmed as the permanent docent of the Department of Political Economy and Statistics. In May 1920 the guberniya administration published his books The course of statistics and demographics of 3,500 releases and The important characteristics of the Ukrainian ethnicity in comparison to other ethnics of 1,500.

Life in the Soviet Ukraine
By the end of 1920 Ostapenko relocated to Kyiv. In May 1921 the Supreme Extraordinary Tribunal began the hearing of the affair of Ukrainian SRs on which Ostapenko was invited as a witness. However, by the proposition of Dmitry Manuilsky he was placed amongst the ones under trail. Ostapenko plead not guilty and was given five years of correctional labor camps. Later unexpectedly the sentence was changed and he was forced to work by specialty instead of katorga, due to his value as a scientific force. Further his fate is not known. There are speculations that 1931 he was arrested by the NKVD and perished in the labor camps (according to the Encyclopedia of Ukraine) sometime in 1937.

References

External links
 Ukrainian Martyrolog of the XX century
 Biography at the website of Ministry of Foreign Affairs
 Biography at the website of Cabinet of Ministers

1881 births
1937 deaths
People from Zhytomyr Oblast
People from Volhynian Governorate
Ukrainian people in the Russian Empire
Ukrainian Socialist-Revolutionary Party politicians
Ukrainian politicians before 1991
Prime ministers of the Ukrainian People's Republic
People who died in the Gulag